Thomas Road is a major west–east road in the far southern suburbs of Perth, Western Australia, connecting Rockingham Road (part of Highway 1) in Kwinana's industrial area with Kwinana's urban area, before bridging Perth's agricultural fringe to meet the South Western Highway in Byford, just south of Armadale. Thomas Road was the terminus of the Kwinana Freeway from 1993 until 2002, and presently serves as the terminus of Tonkin Highway after its extension beyond Albany Highway in 2003.

Thomas Road forms the entirety of State Route 21.

Major intersections

  Rockingham Road (National Route 1) – to Spearwood and Fremantle / Rockingham and Mandurah
 Gilmore Avenue – Kwinana Town Centre, Parmelia, Calista, Leda
 Johnson Road – Bertram, Wellard
  Kwinana Freeway (State Route 2) – Jandakot, Perth CBD / Rockingham
 Anketell Road - Wandi, Aubin Grove, Perth CBD
  Nicholson Road (State Route 31) – Canning Vale, Cannington
  Tonkin Highway (State Route 4) – Gosnells, Perth Airport
  South Western Highway (State Route 20) –

See also

References 

Roads in Perth, Western Australia